Governor Jenkins may refer to:

John Jenkins (governor) (died 1681), Governor of Albemarle (now North Carolina) four times between 1672 and 1681
Evan Meredith Jenkins (1896–1985), Governor of the Punjab in the British Empire from 1946 to 1947